Gomphidius largus is a fungus native to North America.

References

External links

 

Boletales
Fungi of North America